The Sea (Marine) Facade is a project of additional expansion of St. Petersburg, on Vasilievsky Island at the Neva river's mouth.
In these new territories the Passenger Port of St. Petersburg will be created along with a considerable amount of residential and commercial space.
The Western Rapid Diameter highway  will be built across these lands.

This project is being implemented within the framework of a public-private partnership between the Saint Petersburg City Administration and Marine Facade Management Company.
The primary goal of this project is to build the Passenger Port of St. Petersburg by reclaiming new territories of 476 hectares from the Neva Bay in the Gulf of Finland. The total cost of the project is estimated 3 billion dollars.
The project will reportedly build over 1.5 million square metres of office space, 3 million square metres of residential space, as well as retail, entertainment and social objects, two subway stations, a marina etc.

In 2008, the first phase of works has been finished, an area of 150 hectares was reclaimed for the port building. Reclamation of additional 20 hectares for the Western Rapid Diameter and the construction of buildings is now underway.

Construction milestones chronology
2006
 The area of 35 hectares have been reclaimed.
 The underwater channel for the moorings in the port's aquatic area has been built.
 Construction of the service access road has been finished.
 The dividing dam have been built.
2007
 The reclaimed area is about 80 hectares (half of this area is intended to be under the passenger terminal). As of July, more than 70% of work has been done.
 By July, 28th (Navy Day) the training sailing ship named "Young Baltiets" has moored at berth 7 and the Passenger Port of St. Petersburg was launched.
2008
 In May, the builders announced the beginning of sale of space for the residential and commercial buildings on the reclaimed lands.
2009
 In August, a hydrofoil line to Peterhof and the Winter Palace was launched.
 In September, the sea passenger port accepted first cruise ship with passengers.
2011
 In May, work on the passenger port was finished and the newly completed Marine Facade sea passenger port was officially handed over to the city government.
2014
 On June 25, the passenger port serviced seven cruise ships in its seven berths and four terminals—more than 12,000 passengers combined.

References

External links
  

Gulf of Finland
Land reclamation